Jai DiLouie (born September 11, 1958) is a former professional tennis player from the United States.

Biography
DiLouie, a left-handed player from Dallas, was the top ranked junior in Texas in 1974 and 1975. A member of the US Junior Davis Cup team, he won National Grass Court Junior Tennis title in 1975, after saving eight match points against John McEnroe in the semi-finals. He won the junior event held at the 1976 Australian Open and also participated in the men's doubles draw. Just weeks after that tournament he was runner-up to Ray Kelly in the Australian Under 19's Championships in Brisbane. He was coached from the age of nine by former Australian player Warren Jacques.

In singles his first Grand Slam main draw appearances came in 1978, at the US Open where he lost in the opening round to Johan Kriek, then the Australian Open, in which he made the second round, beating Rod Frawley. 

As a member of the varsity tennis at Southern Methodist University he was a three-time All-American, in 1977, 1979 and 1980. He won the singles title at the Southwest Conference in 1979 and made the NCAA doubles quarter-finals in 1980.

Following the completion of his business administration degree, DiLouie turned professional and competed on tour for a further four years. He won a Challenger title in Turin in 1980, with Wayne Hampson in the doubles. At the 1982 South Orange Open, a tournament on the Grand Prix circuit, DiLouie was a doubles finalist with Blaine Willenborg. They were beaten in the final by Raúl Ramírez and Van Winitsky. He played as a qualifier at the 1982 US Open.

At the beginning of the 1987 season, DiLouie began coaching Chris Evert. Later in the year he was appointed women's head coach at Southern Methodist University and led the team to the SWC Team Championship. He remained with Evert until October 1989 and also worked as a coach for the Lawn Tennis Association in England. From 1992 to 1993 he was Director of Tennis at Springpark Tennis and Swim Club, then worked for many years as a national coach for the United States Tennis Association.

Grand Prix career finals

Doubles: 1 (0–1)

Challenger titles

Doubles: (1)

References

External links
 
 

1958 births
Living people
American male tennis players
Tennis players from Dallas
SMU Mustangs men's tennis players
SMU Mustangs women's tennis coaches
American tennis coaches